Llewellyn Harrison Rockwell Jr. (born July 1, 1944) is an American author, editor, and political consultant. A libertarian and a self-professed anarcho-capitalist, he founded and is the chairman of the Mises Institute, a non-profit dedicated to promoting the Austrian School of economics.

After graduating from university, Rockwell took a job at Arlington House publishers, a conservative publishing house. Through this work, he encountered the works and political theories of his mentor Murray Rothbard. Reading Rothbard led Rockwell to become an ardent believer in Austrian economics and what he calls "libertarian anarchism". After his ideological transformation, Rockwell went on to work as chief of staff to Congressman Ron Paul from 1978 to 1982, and partnered with Rothbard in 1982 to found the Mises Institute in Alabama, where , Rockwell still serves as chairman.

Rockwell's website, LewRockwell.com, was launched in 1999. The website features articles about political philosophy, economics, and contemporary politics. The website's motto is "anti-war, anti-state, pro-market". The website is primarily home to right-libertarian authors, although left-wing anti-war writers have been featured.

Life and career
Rockwell was born in Boston, Massachusetts, in 1944. After college, Rockwell worked at Arlington House publishers and became acquainted with the works of Ludwig von Mises.

In the mid-1970s, Rockwell worked at Hillsdale College in fundraising and public relations. Rockwell met Murray Rothbard in 1975 and credits Rothbard with convincing him to abandon minarchism and reject the state completely.

Work for Ron Paul 

Rockwell was Ron Paul's congressional chief of staff from 1978 to 1982 and was a consultant to Paul's 1988 Libertarian Party campaign for President of the United States. He was vice-chair of the exploratory committee for Paul's run for the 1992 Republican Party nomination for president.

Mises Institute 

In 1982, Rockwell founded the Ludwig von Mises Institute in Auburn, Alabama, and is chairman of the board.

The Mises Institute published Rockwell's Speaking of Liberty, an anthology of editorials which were originally published on his website, along with transcripts from some of his speaking engagements.

View on Russia and the Bucha Massacre 
Rockwell's perspective on Putin:" Russian invasion can still be stopped. All that’s required is that a pro-Russian government take power in Ukraine. This is what Putin wants."
Rockwell continues reiterating, "If Ukraine gets a pro-Russian government, this would not be Russian “aggression.

Rockwell questions if the Bucha Massacre could turn out to be "Voldomyr Zelenskyy and Ukraine, were responsible for whatever took place in Bucha"..

This belief by Rockwell contradicts the findings/investigation of the
EU 
the UN

the United States of America.

Other independent organizations:
as The International Red Cross

Paleolibertarianism

In 1985, Rockwell was named a contributing editor to Conservative Digest. During the 1990s, Rothbard, Rockwell and others described their views as paleolibertarian to emphasize their commitment to cultural conservatism, even as they continued to hold anti-statist beliefs.

In a 2007 interview, Rockwell revealed he no longer considered himself a "paleolibertarian" and was "happy with the term libertarian." He explained "the term paleolibertarian became confused because of its association with paleoconservative, so it came to mean some sort of socially conservative libertarian, which wasn't the point at all...."

LewRockwell.com
Rockwell's website, LewRockwell.com, formed in 1999, features articles and blog entries by multiple columnists and writers. Its motto is "anti-war, anti-state, pro-market". There also is a weekly podcast called The Lew Rockwell Show. , it was in the top 10,000 websites in the United States. LewRockwell.com publishes articles questioning United States participation in World War II, opposing "economic fascism" and supporting Austrian economics and secessionism.

Brian Doherty of Reason wrote that the site's "Mises Institute-associated writers" tend to emphasize the domestic and international fallout from government action. Conservative writer Jonah Goldberg of National Review wrote that the site regularly hosts invective against icons of American mainstream conservatism, including National Review, The Weekly Standard, neoconservatives, and William F. Buckley Jr. A writer in The American Conservative described the site as paleolibertarian and "an indispensable source" of news on Ron Paul. The site has been criticized for presenting articles which advocate HIV/AIDS denialism, the view that HIV does not cause AIDS, and the view that vaccines cause autism.

Ron Paul newsletters

Reason magazine reported Rockwell was a founding officer and former vice president at Ron Paul & Associates which was one of the publishers of a variety of political and investment-oriented newsletters bearing Paul's name.

In January 2008, during Ron Paul's 2008 presidential campaign, James Kirchick of The New Republic uncovered a collection of Ron Paul newsletters that contained "decades worth of obsession with conspiracies, sympathy for the right-wing militia movement, and deeply held bigotry against blacks, Jews, and gays." For instance, one issue approved of the slogan "Sodomy = Death" and said homosexuals suffering from HIV/AIDS "enjoy the pity and attention that comes with being sick".

Kirchick wrote that most of the articles contained no bylines. Numerous sources alleged that Rockwell had ghostwritten the controversial newsletters; Rockwell is listed as "contributing editor" on physical copies of some newsletters and listed as sole Editor of the May 1988 "Ron Paul investment Newsletter". Reason magazine reported that "a half-dozen longtime libertarian activists – including some still close to Paul" had identified Rockwell as the "chief ghostwriter" of the newsletters, as did former Ron Paul Chief of Staff (1981–1985) John W. Robbins.

Rockwell admitted to Kirchick that he was "involved in the promotion" of the newsletters and wrote the subscription letters but denied ghostwriting the articles. He said there were "seven or eight freelancers involved at various stages" of the newsletter's history and indicated another individual who had "left in unfortunate circumstances", but whom he did not identify, was in charge of editing and publishing the newsletters. Ron Paul himself repudiated the newsletters' content and said he was not involved in the daily operations of the newsletters or saw much of their content until years later. In 2011 Paul's spokesperson Jesse Benton said that Paul had "taken moral responsibility because they appeared under his name and slipped through under his watch".

Other activities and views

Rockwell was closely associated with anarcho-capitalist theorist Murray Rothbard until Rothbard's death in 1995. Rockwell's paleolibertarian ideology, like Rothbard's in his later years, combines a right-libertarian theory of anarcho-capitalism based on natural rights with the cultural conservative values and concerns of paleoconservatism, and he identifies strongly with the modern Rothbardian tradition of Austrian economics. In politics, he advocates federalist or Anti-Federalist policies as means to achieve increasing degrees of freedom from central government and secession for the same political decentralist reasons. Rockwell has called environmentalism "an ideology as pitiless and Messianic as Marxism."

Rockwell also serves as Vice President of the Center for Libertarian Studies in Burlingame, California.

Books

Author
 Speaking of Liberty (2003; online e-book) 
 The Left, The Right, and The State (2008; online e-book) 
 Against the State: An Anarcho-Capitalist Manifesto (2014) 
 Fascism vs. Capitalism (2013) 
 Against The Left: A Rothbardian Libertarianism (2019)

Editor
 Man, Economy, and Liberty: Essays in Honor of Murray N. Rothbard (with Walter Block) (1986; online e-book) 
 The Free Market Reader (1988; online e-book)
 The Economics of Liberty (1990; online e-book) 
 The Gold Standard: Perspectives in the Austrian School (1992; online e-book), 
 Murray N. Rothbard: In Memoriam (1995; online e-book) 
 The Irrepressible Rothbard (2000; online e-book – Rockwell's introduction)

Further reading
 Goldberg, Jonah. "Farewell, Lew Rockwell: The final word." National Review Online. March 7, 2001.

See also 

 Anarcho-capitalism
 Hans-Hermann Hoppe
 Libertarianism in the United States
 Ludwig von Mises
 Milton Friedman
 Mises Institute
 Ron Paul
 Thomas Sowell
 Tom Woods

References

External links 

 
 LRC blog
 
 
 Rockwell's article archives:
 LewRockwell.com
 Mises.org

1944 births
Living people
Writers from Boston
20th-century American male writers
20th-century American non-fiction writers
21st-century American male writers
21st-century American non-fiction writers
American anarcho-capitalists
American anti–Iraq War activists
American book editors
American economics writers
American libertarians
American male bloggers
American bloggers
American male non-fiction writers
American political writers
Libertarian theorists
Mises Institute people
Non-interventionism
Paleolibertarianism
Political chiefs of staff
Ron Paul
United States congressional aides
Newsletter publishers (people)